The men's singles Squash event was part of the squash programme and took place between November 18 and 21, at the Asian Games Town Gymnasium.

Schedule
All times are China Standard Time (UTC+08:00)

Results

Finals

Top half

Section 1

Section 2

Bottom half

Section 3

Section 4

References 

Men – Individual

Squash at the 2010 Asian Games